Codex Dublinensis designated by Z or 035 (in the Gregory-Aland numbering), ε 26 (von Soden), is a Greek uncial manuscript of the Gospels, dated palaeographically to the 6th century. The manuscript is lacunose.

Description 

The codex contains a portions of the text of Gospel of Matthew, on 32 parchment leaves, with numerous lacunae. The text is written in one column per page, 21 lines per column, in 27 letters in line.

The uncial letters are large, broad, attractive, and very precise. The letters are larger than in codices Alexandrinus and Vaticanus, but smaller than in Codex Petropolitanus Purpureus.

It is a palimpsest. The upper text is a patristic written in a minuscule hand, John Chrysostom contributing has the largest share. The codex contains the Ammonian Sections, but there is no the Eusebian Canons.
No breathings or accents. The Old Testament quotations are indicated by >. Letter μ is very peculiar, it looks like inverted Π.

Itacistic errors are present, e.g. αι with ε confused, and ι with ει.

Contents 

Matthew 1:17-2:6, 2:13-20, 4:4-13, 5:45-6:15, 7:16-8:6, 10:40-11:18, 12:43-13:11, 13:57-14:19, 15:13-23, 17:9-17, 17:26-18:6, 19:4-12, 21-28, 20:7-21:8, 21:23-30, 22:16-25, 22:37-23:3, 23:15-23, 24:15-25, 25:1-11, 26:21-29, 62-71.

Text 

The Greek text of this codex is a representative of the Alexandrian text-type, with many alien readings. The Alexandrian text is familiar to the Codex Sinaiticus. Aland placed it in Category III.

In the Lord's Prayer it does not contain doxology:  (Matthew 6:13) as in codices א B D 0170 f1.

In  it does not contain  (and be baptized with the baptism that I am baptized with), as in codices Sinaiticus, B, D, L, Θ, 085, f1, f13, it, syrs, c, copsa.

History 
The codex was discovered by John Barrett in 1787, under some cursive writing. Barrett published its text in 1801, but with errors. The codex was exposed to chemicals by Tregelles, and was deciphered by him in 1853. Tregelles added about 200 letters to the text of Barrett.

The codex is located now in the Trinity College Library (K 3.4) in Dublin.

See also 

 List of New Testament uncials
 Textual criticism

References

Further reading 

 John Barrett, Evangelium secundum Matthaeum ex codice rescripto in bibliotheca collegii ssae Trinitatis iuxta Dublinum (Dublin, 1801).
 S. P. Tregelles, The Dublin codex rescriptus: a supplement (London, 1863).
 T. K. Abbott, On An Uncial Palimpsest Evangelistarium, Hermathena X (1884), pp. 146–150.
  
 J. G. Smyly, Notes on Greek Mss. in the Library of Trinity College, Hermathena XLVIII (1933).

External links 
 Codex Dublinensis Z (035): at the Encyclopedia of Textual Criticism

Greek New Testament uncials
6th-century biblical manuscripts
Palimpsests